Burton is an English surname with habitational origins.

People surnamed Burton
 Aron Burton (1938–2016), American blues singer, bass guitarist and songwriter
 Baron Burton is a peerage title created in 1886 and 1887 in the Peerage of the United Kingdom
 Abraham Burton (born 1971), American saxophonist and bandleader.
 Adam Burton, better known as Maxwell Atoms, American animator
 Alexander Burton (1893–1915), Australian recipient of the Victoria Cross
 Alfred Henry Burton (c. 1834 – 1914), New Zealand photographer
 Alison Burton (1921–2014), Australian tennis player
 Amanda Burton (born 1957), Northern Irish actress
 Amanda Burton (born 1980), Australian netball player
 Andrew Burton (disambiguation), multiple people
 Arthur Burton (c. 1889 – death unknown), rugby league footballer who played in the 1900s, 1910s and 1920s
 Beryl Burton (1937–1996), English racing cyclist
 Bob Burton Jr. (born 1985), American speedcuber
 Brandie Burton (born 1972), American professional golfer
 Brett Burton (born 1978), Australian rules footballer
 Brian Burton, better known as Danger Mouse (born 1977), American producer and disc jockey
 Charles Burton (disambiguation), multiple people
 Charlotte Burton (1881–1942), American silent film actress
 Clarence Burton (disambiguation), multiple people
 Cliff Burton (1962–1986), Metallica bassist
 Corey Burton (born 1955), American voice actor
 Dan Burton (born 1938), U.S. Congressman
 Daniel Burton (born 1963), American cyclist, Antarctica Cycling Expeditions
 Decimus Burton (1800–1881), English architect and garden designer
 Deon Burton (born 1976), English-Jamaican footballer
 Deonte Burton (born 1991), American basketball player
 Dick Burton (golfer) (1907–1874), British golfer
 Edmund Burton (footballer), (1893–1916), English footballer
 Elizabeth Eaton Burton (1869–1937), American artist
 Ellis Burton (1936–2013), American baseball player
 Ernie Burton (1921–1999), English professional footballer
 Ethel Burton, American comedic film actress
 Francis Burton (disambiguation), multiple people
 Frederick Burton (disambiguation)
 Gary Burton (born 1943), American jazz vibraphone player
 George Burton (disambiguation)
 Hal B. Burton, American politician
 Harold Hitz Burton (1888–1964), American politician and Supreme Court Justice
 Harrison Burton (born 2000), American racing driver
 Harry Burton (Egyptologist), British egyptologist
 Harry Burton (journalist) (1968–2001), Australian journalist
 Henry Burton (Conservative politician) (1876–1947), British Conservative MP for Sudbury 1924–1945
 Henry Burton (physician) (1799–1849), English physician
 Henry Burton (theologian) (1578–1648), English puritan
 Henry Burton-Peters (1792–1875), Whig MP for Beverley (UK Parliament constituency) 1830–1837
 Henry Burton Buckley, 1st Baron Wrenbury, British barrister and judge
 Hilarie Burton (born 1982), American actress
 Humphrey Burton, CBE (born 1931), British classical music presenter, broadcaster, director, producer and biographer of musicians
 Hutchins Gordon Burton (1774–1832), American politician
 Jake Burton Carpenter (1954–2019), American snowboarder
 James Burton (disambiguation)
 Janet Burton, British academic
 Jared Burton (born 1981), American baseball player
 Jeb Burton (born 1992), American stock car racing driver
 Jeff Burton (born 1967), American stock car racing driver
 Jenny Burton (born 1957), American rhythm and blues singer
 Joan Burton (born 1949), Irish politician
 John Burton (disambiguation)
 Kate Burton (disambiguation)
 Katherine Burton (1890–1969), American social activist and Catholic convert
 Ken Burton (born 1970), British chorist, composer and recording artist
 Konni Burton (born 1963), American politician
 Kris Burton (born 1980), Australia-born Italian rugby player
 Lance Burton (born 1960), American stage magician
 Leonard Burton (born 1964), American football player
 Leonard Samuel Burton (1824–1895), educator and mayor in Gawler, South Australia
 LeVar Burton (born 1957), American actor
 Lewis Burton (born 1992), British tennis player and model
 Lori Burton (born 1940), American singer and songwriter
 Margaret E. Burton, American missionary to China and Japan
 Marion LeRoy Burton (1874–1925), American scholar
 Mark Burton (disambiguation), multiple people
 Maurice Burton (1898–1992), English zoologist and author
 Maurice Burton (cyclist) (born 1955), English cyclist
 Michael Burton (born 1992), American football player
 Montague Burton (1885–1952), founder of Burton clothes shops
 Nancy Jane Burton (1891–1972), Scottish artist
 Norman Burton, American actor
 Oliver Burton, English footballer
 Ollie Burton, Welsh international footballer
 Patricia Burton, All-American Girls Professional Baseball League player
 Peter Burton, British actor
 Phillip Burton, American politician
 Ralph Burton (died 1768), British soldier in Canada
 Raymond S. Burton, American politician
 Reginald George Burton (1864–1951), British Indian army officer, sportsman, military historian
 Richard Burton (1925–1984), Welsh actor
 Richard Burton (comics), British comic editor
 Richard Francis Burton (1821–1890), British explorer, translator, orientalist
 Richard Henry Burton (1923–1993), English recipient of the Victoria Cross
 Rob Burton, Mayor of Oakville, Ontario, Canada
 Robert Burton (scholar) (1577–1640), English scholar, cleric and author
 Robert Burton (statesman) (1747–1825), North Carolina delegate to Continental Congress
 Roderick Burton, better known as Dolla (1987–2009), American rapper
 Ron Burton (1936–2003), American football player
 Sala Burton, American politician
 Sam Burton (1926–2020), English footballer
 Samuel Burton, Irish politician
 Samuel F. Burton (Born 1932), British-American Nuclear Physicist
 Samuel S. Burton (1822–1892), American judge
 Sarah Burton, creative director of Alexander McQueen
 Steve Burton (disambiguation)
 Terry Burton, English football manager
 Terry C. Burton, American politician
 Theodore E. Burton (1851–1929), American politician
 Theodore M. Burton (1907–1989), LDS General Authority
 Thomas Burton (died 1496 or 1495), Loughborough, England, wool merchant
 Thomas Burton (died 1661), British Member of Parliament for Westmorland, 1656–1659
 T. L. Burton, professor of medieval English literature at the University of Adelaide
 Tom Burton, American professional wrestler
 Thomas Burton Adams Jr., commonly known as Tom Burton
 Thomas Burton Hanly, (1812–1880), Confederate politician
 Tim Burton (born 1958), American film director
 Tim Burton (musician) (born 1963), American saxophonist
 Tommie Burton (1878–1946), West Indian cricketer
 Tony Burton (1937–2016), U.S. actor, comedian, boxer, and football player
 Trey Burton (born 1991), American football player
 Trevor Burton (born 1944), English guitarist
 Tyler Burton (born 2000), American basketball player
 Veronica Burton (basketball) (born 2000), American basketball player
 Virginia Lee Burton (1909–1968), American illustrator and children's book author
 Walter John Burton, New Zealand photographer
 Ward Burton (born 1961), American stock car racing driver
 Wes Burton (born 1980), American racing driver
 William Burton (disambiguation)

Given name
Burton Barr (1917–1997), American politician from Arizona
Burton Cummings (born 1947), Canadian musician
Burton E. Green (1868–1965), American oilman and co-founder of Beverly Hills, California
Burton Hecht (born 1927), New York politician and judge
Burt Lancaster (1913–1994), American actor
Burt Reynolds (1936–2018), American actor, producer and stuntman

Other
Janne "Burton" Puurtinen (born 1974), Finnish musician

Fictional characters 
 Burton Guster, from the television series Psych
 Burton Wayne, from the novel To a God Unknown, by John Steinbeck
 Jack Burton, from Big Trouble in Little China
 Madlax characters:
 Richard Burton
 Margaret Burton (Madlax)
 Barry Burton, from Resident Evil
 Colonel Burton, character in the strategy game Command & Conquer: Generals
 "Big Guy"  Bill Burton, one of Hao's followers in the manga and anime series Shaman King
 Burton Phillips, from Hollyoaks in the City
 Mel Burton from Hollyoaks, Sophie's twin
 Sophie Burton from Hollyoaks, Mel's twin
 Justin Burton from Hollyoaks, Sophie and Mel's younger brother

See also
 Burton (disambiguation)

References

English-language surnames